Omega TV is a free to air terrestrial TV channel. It is the first private television channel established in Cyprus. Since the launch of the channel in 1992, it has been dedicated to broadcasting high quality Cypriot and Greek programming including kids programs as well as Church orientated programs. The channel also imports successful series from abroad and shows these in their original language with Greek subtitles.

Popular local programs include "Ta Psarka", "To Serial" and "Avlajhia". The Cypriot television channel has also broadcast successful series such as "Gymnoi Aggeloi" (Naked Angels) in 2010 and "Oneiro Itan" (It was a dream) in 2013 and also has long-standing agreements in place to broadcast content from both Star Channel and Open TV in Greece.

On Screen Branding
The channel originally launched in 1992 as Logos and used this name for 7 years before the channel re-branding to MEGA in 1999.

From 1999 to 18 October 2016, the channel was known as MEGA Channel Cyprus and had the same branding and on-screen identity as the sister channel Mega Channel Greece. On 18 October 2016, the transitional MEGAOne brand was launched and was used until 4 September 2017 when the TVOne brand was introduced. On 25 October 2018 (3 days before Mega Channel Greece stopped television broadcasting), the channel renamed as OMEGA.

OMEGA LIVE Portal
Omega have their own news portal called OMEGA LIVE which features news from Cyprus and the world as well as offering TV guides, live streaming and video on demand services. This portal launched in 2018 using the name TVONE NEWS (ex. LIVE NEWS) before later rebranding to OMEGA LIVE.

Broadcasts
The station is located at Strovolos, Nicosia. It is broadcast on DVB-T all over Cyprus and Mega Channel is also carried on digital cable systems and via the internet.

History
Omega was established as "Ο Λόγος" (The Word) on 26 April 1992 and was the first private television station at Cyprus. It was owned completely by the Church of Cyprus.

Logos

References

Television channels in Cyprus
Greek-language television stations
Television channels and stations established in 1992
1992 establishments in Cyprus